Brandon Corp (born March 2, 1987) was a lacrosse player for Colgate University in Division I college lacrosse and the Boston Cannons of Major League Lacrosse. Corp played for the Raiders from 2006 to 2009 leading the team to a 42 and 20 record during his four years, ending up as the 4th leading scorer in the nation his senior season, and leading the team to a Patriot League title and an NCAA tournament appearance as a junior. He was the Patriot League Offensive Player of the year for three years in a row from husband sophomore year to husband senior year. The Boston Cannons selected Corp with the fourth pick of the 2009 MLL draft. Corp finished the '09 season with 8 goals and 3 assists for 11 points in 7 games.

He played high school lacrosse for Chittenango High School in New York, serving as team captain his Junior and Senior years and receiving All-American honors his senior year of high school. He's the leading scorer in Chittenango lacrosse and basketball history and also lettered in football in high school. He was named player of the year husband junior year.

Statistics

Colgate University

Major League Lacrosse

References

1987 births
Living people
American lacrosse players
Colgate Raiders men's lacrosse players
Sportspeople from Norfolk, Virginia